This is a partial list of people named in the Pandora Papers as shareholders, directors and beneficiaries of offshore companies. In total, 35 current and former national leaders appear in the leaked documents, alongside 400 officials from nearly 100 countries. More than 100 billionaires, 29,000 offshore accounts, 30 current and former leaders, and 300 public officials were named in the first leaks in October 2021. An estimated $32 trillion may be hidden from being taxed, according to reports.

Heads of state

Current heads of state at the time of the release 
 Ilham Aliyev, President of Azerbaijan
 Sebastián Piñera, President of Chile
 Denis Sassou Nguesso, President of the Republic of the Congo
 Nicos Anastasiades, President of Cyprus
 Luis Abinader, President of the Dominican Republic
 Guillermo Lasso, President of Ecuador
 Ali Bongo Ondimba, President of Gabon
 Abdullah II, King of Jordan
 Uhuru Kenyatta, President of Kenya
 Milo Đukanović, President of Montenegro
 Tamim bin Hamad Al Thani, Emir of Qatar
 Volodymyr Zelenskyy, President of Ukraine

Former heads of state 
 César Gaviria, former President of Colombia.
 Andrés Pastrana, former President of Colombia.
 Alfredo Cristiani, former President of El Salvador
 Francisco Flores Pérez, former President of El Salvador
 Porfirio Lobo Sosa, former President of Honduras
 Ricardo Martinelli, former President of Panama
 Ernesto Pérez Balladares, former President of Panama
 Juan Carlos Varela, former President of Panama
 Horacio Cartes, former President of Paraguay
 Pedro Pablo Kuczynski, former President of Peru

Heads of government

Current heads of government at the time of the release 
 Patrick Achi, Prime Minister of Ivory Coast
 Najib Mikati, Prime Minister of Lebanon
 Sheikh Mohammed bin Rashid Al Maktoum, Prime Minister of the United Arab Emirates and Emir of Dubai

Former heads of government 
 Andrej Babiš, former Prime Minister of the Czech Republic
 Sheikh Khalifa bin Salman Al Khalifa, former Prime Minister of Bahrain
 Bidzina Ivanishvili, former Prime Minister of Georgia
 Laurent Lamothe, former Prime Minister of Haiti
 Leung Chun-ying, former Chief Executive of Hong Kong
 Tung Chee-hwa, former Chief Executive of Hong Kong
 Abdul Karim Kabariti, former Prime Minister of Jordan
 Hassan Diab, former Prime Minister of Lebanon
 Sükhbaataryn Batbold, former Prime Minister of Mongolia
 Chimed Saikhanbileg, former Prime Minister of Mongolia
 Aires Ali, former Prime Minister of Mozambique
 Tony Blair, former Prime Minister of the United Kingdom

Heads of organizations 
 Dominique Strauss-Kahn, former managing director of the International Monetary Fund.
 Ivan Bakanov, former Head of the Security Service of Ukraine.

Ministers 

  Jorge Arganis Díaz Leal, Secretary of Communications and Transport
 Paulo Guedes, Minister of the Economy
 Andrey Vavilov, former Russian Deputy Finance Minister
 Wopke Hoekstra, Minister of Finance and Leader of the Christian Democratic Appeal
 Shaukat Tarin, Finance Minister of Pakistan
 Moonis Elahi, Minister for Water Resources
 Raja Nadir Pervez, Former Minister for Interior of Pakistan
 Charles Sipanje, former Permanent Secretary of Zambia
 Jonathan Aitken, former Chief Secretary to the Treasury
 John Dalli, Former Minister of Economy, Finance and Foreign Affairs of Malta, and EU Commissioner
 Arthur Tugade, incumbent Secretary of Transportation
 Airlangga Hartarto, Coordinating Minister for Economic Affairs
 Luhut Binsar Pandjaitan, Coordinating Minister for Maritime and investments Affairs
 Jim Muhwezi, Ugandan Security Minister
 Daim Zainuddin, former Malaysian Minister of Finance and Chief of the Council of Eminent Persons (CEP)
 Tengku Zafrul Aziz, Malaysian Minister of International Trade and Industry
 Yamani Hafez Musa, former Malaysian Deputy Minister of Finance
 Ahmad Zahid Hamidi, Deputy Prime Minister of Malaysia and President of the United Malays National Organisation (UMNO)
 Siniša Mali, Minister of Finance and former Mayor of Belgrade
 Novica Tončev, Minister without portfolio and former Mayor of Surdulica
 Mohamed Abdellahi Ould Yaha, former Mauritanian Minister of Investment
 Nirupama Rajapaksa, former Deputy Minister of Water Supply & Drainage of Sri Lanka
 Mohsen Marzouk, Secretary-General of the Arab Democracy Foundation
 , Minister of Transport of Colombia
 Rafael Ramírez Carreño, former minister of Oil and Mining and former president of Petróleos de Venezuela (PDVSA) between 2004 and 2013.
 Nervis Villalobos, viceminister of energy during the government of Hugo Chávez between 2004 and 2006

Bankers 
  Roberto Campos Neto, president of the Central Bank of Brazil
 Marwan Kheireddine, Lebanese banker, businessperson and former minister
 Riad Salameh, Governor of Lebanon's central bank, Banque du Liban
  Khan Arif Usmani, President of National Bank of Pakistan
 Helen Dee, daughter of Alfonso Yuchengco, Chairman of Rizal Commercial Banking Corporation
 Tito Tettamanti, founder of Fidinam
 Nessim El Maleh, former director of HSBC Private Bank Suisse
 Vitaly Zhogin, former board member of Interprombank
 Jorge Peirano Basso, Dante Peirano Basso, José Peirano Basso, Juan Peirano Basso, Luisa Peirano Basso, Blanca Peirano Basso, María Peirano Basso and Jorge Peirano Facio: Uruguayan family of bankers, convicted for money laundering and fraud
 Alessandro Falciai, former President of Banca Monte dei Paschi di Siena

Media 
  Hameed Haroon, CEO of Dawn Media Group
  Sultan Ali Lakhani, CEO of Express Media Group
  Arif Nizami, journalist and editor of Pakistan Today
  Mir Shakilur Rehman, editor-in-chief of Jang Media Group
 Konstantin Ernst, CEO of Channel One Russia

Legislators 
 Sylvain Maillard, member of the National Assembly and general director of Alantys Technology
 Nir Barkat, former mayor of Jerusalem and current member of the Knesset
 Haim Ramon - former Vice Prime Minister of Israel and former member of the Knesset
 Chaudhry Moonis Elahi, Member of the National Assembly of Pakistan
 Aleem Khan, Senior Minister of Punjab and Minister of Food, Member of the Provincial Assembly of the Punjab
  Sharjeel Memon, former member of the Provincial Assembly of Sindh
 Faisal Vawda, member of the Senate of Pakistan, former member of the National Assembly and former Minister for Water Resources
 The family of Win Gatchalian, Rex Gatchalian and Wes Gatchalian, Senator of the Philippines, the mayor of Valenzuela City and Member of the House of Representatives of the Philippines
 Alexei Chepa, Russian Member of the Federal Assembly
 Paul Deighton, member of the House of Lords and Chairman of The Economist Group
 William Leong, member of the Dewan Rakyat

Politicians
 Satish Sharma, former member of the Union Cabinet in the Government of India.
 Harish Salve, former Solicitor General of India
 Zakaria Idriss Déby Itno, Chadian Ambassador to the United Arab Emirates and stepbrother of President Mahamat Déby
 Delyan Peevski, Bulgarian politician and oligarch, former member of the National Assembly
 Nasry Asfura, current Mayor of Tegucigalpa
 Alexander Mamut, Russian billionaire and former advisor to Boris Yeltsin
 Ben Elliot, co-chairman of the Conservative Party
 Patrick Robertson, British political advisor and founder of the Bruges Group
 Glenn Godfrey, former Attorney-General of Belize
 Jaime Durán Barba, consultant of former President of Argentina Mauricio Macri
 Zulema María Eva Menem, former First Lady of Argentina and daughter of former President of Argentina Carlos Menem
 Daniel Muñoz, secretary of former President of Argentina Néstor Kirchner
 , former advisor of Mexican President Andrés Manuel López Obrador
  Enrique Martinez y Martinez, Former governor of Coahuila (1999-2015)
  José Manuel Sanz Rivera,
 Andres D. Bautista, former Chairman of the Commission on Elections and Chairman of the Presidential Commission on Good Government
 Rolando Gapud, Executive Chairman of Del Monte Pacific Limited, former Member of the Board of Governors of the Development Bank of the Philippines and former associate of the late dictator Ferdinand Marcos
 Dennis Uy, chairman and CEO of Udenna Corporation, and CEO of CSO of Phoenix Petroleum, Honorary Consul of the Philippines in Kazakhstan and associate of Philippine President Rodrigo Duterte
 Jürg Wissmann, Swiss attorney and politician for the Christian Democratic People's Party
 Aymeric Chauprade, former member of the European Parliament
 Nicolas Perruchot, former mayor of Blois and former member of the French National Assembly
 Lisandro Junco Riveira, chairman of National Directorate of Taxes and Customs
 Guillermo Botero, Colombian Ambassador to Chile and former Minister of Defense
 Luis Diego Monsalve, Colombian Ambassador to China
 Fuad Char Abdala, former congressman.
 Alejandro Char Chaljub, former Mayor of Barranquilla and former Governor of Atlántico.
 Arturo Char Chaljub, senator and former President of Congress.
 David Char Navas, former congressman indicted for colliding with paramilitaries.
 Carlos Morales Troncoso, former Vice President of the Dominican Republic

 Abubakar Atiku Bagudu, governor of Kebbi State
 Yassir Znagui, advisor of Moroccan king Mohammed VI and former minister
 Marta Lucía Ramírez, Vice President of Colombia.
 Ricardo Álvarez, current Vice President of Honduras and former mayor of Tegucigalpa.
 Xavier García Albiol, mayor of Badalona and former senator and member of the Catalan parliament.
 Bernabò Bocca, president of Federalberghi and former senator of Forza Italia
 Youssef Benjelloun, member of the parliament for the Justice and development party.

Relatives and associates of government officials 

  Sergei Sheiman, son of Viktor Sheiman, Belarusian politician
 Marie Gisèle Minlo Momo, wife of Babel Ndanga Ndinga, former Cameroonian Minister of Mining, Trade and Expertise Growth
 Nour-El-Fath Azali, son of President Azali Assoumani
 Faharate Mahamoud, sister of the Comoros Minister of Interior, Mahamoud Fakridine
 Ibrahim Bagudu, brother of Abubakar Atiku Bagudu
 Svetlana Krivonogikh, associate and alleged former lover of Russian President Vladimir Putin
 Gennady Timchenko, billionaire Russian oligarch and close friend of President Vladimir Putin
 Petr Kolbin, businessman and close friend of President Vladimir Putin
  Cherie Blair, wife of former British Prime Minister Tony Blair
 Helena de Chair, wife of Jacob Rees-Mogg, Leader of the House of Commons
 Marina Berlusconi, daughter of Silvio Berlusconi
 Silvia Tucci, ex-wife of Gianni De Michelis, member of the Italian Socialist Party, who served as minister in many Italian governments

Royalty
  Corinna zu Sayn-Wittgenstein-Sayn, German-born Danish princess and entrepreneur
 Abdullah II, King of Jordan
 Lalla Hasnaa, Princess of Morocco
 Tamim bin Hamad Al Thani, Emir of Qatar
 House of Thani, Qatari Royal family
 Juan Carlos I, former King of Spain
 Crown Estate of the United Kingdom

Religious figures 

  Father Luis Garza Medina, former Vicar General of the Legion of Christ

Businesspeople 
  Binod Chaudhary, Nepalese billionaire businessman 
 Taib, chairman of Comsquare.
 Saïd Alj, Moroccan businessman. Founder of the Sanam Holding.
 Moulay Abdallah Lalami, CEO of Societe Fiduciaire du Maroc or SFM.
 Faïçal Mekouar, CEO of Fidaroc Grant Thornton.
 Omar Alaoui, moroccan arquitect.
 Lee Jae Yong, chairman of Samsung.
 Abu Jamal, Saudi Arabian billionaire.
 Niranjan Hiranandani, Indian businessperson
 Pramod Mittal, Indian businessperson
 Anil Ambani, Indian businessperson
 Nirav Modi, Indian businessperson
 Vinod Adani, Indian businessperson
 Kiran Mazumdar-Shaw, Indian businessperson
 John Shaw, British businessperson and husband of Kiran Mazumdar-Shaw
 Robert F. Smith, American investor and CEO of Vista Equity Partners and Democratic Party donor
 Robert T. Brockman, American billionaire and CEO of Reynolds & Reynolds and Republican Party donor
 Jared Wheat, drug smuggler and former CEO of Hi-Tech Pharmaceuticals
 David R. Hinkson, convicted criminal and founder of WaterOz
 , Belarusian-American businessperson
 Erman Ilıcak, businessperson, investor, and president of Rönesans Holding
 Yuri Kovalchuk, Russian shareholder in Bank Rossiya
 Victor Fedotov, Russian oil tycoon
 Semyon Vainshtok, CEO of Transneft
 Mikhail Gutseriev, Russian oligarch
  Suleyman Kerimov, Russian oligarch
 Lubov Chernukhin, Russian-born British banker and major donor to the British Conservative Party
 Antonio Oburu, managing director of GePetrol
 Javed Afridi, Owner of the Peshawar Zalmi franchise, Pakistani business executive and entrepreneur.
 María Asunción Aramburuzabala, Mexican businessperson
 Germán Larrea Mota-Velasco, Mexican businessperson
 Bernard de Laguiche, board director of Solvay S.A.
 Hubert de Wangen, former executive at Solvay S.A.
 Bruce Rockowitz, Chairman of Rock Media International
 Graeme Briggs, founder of the Asiaciti Trust.
 Lim Kok Thay, Malaysian billionaire, Chairman & CEO Genting Group
 Joseph Tsai, co-founder and executive vice chairman of Alibaba Group
 Allan Zeman, CEO of Mesco Shipyard Ltd
 , Chinese billionaire
 Aco Đukanović, Montenegrin businessperson, brother of Milo Đukanović
 Blažo Đukanović, Montenegrin businessperson, son of Milo Đukanović
 Nikola Petrović, Serbian businessman and best man of Aleksandar Vučić
 Sattar Hajee Abdoula, CEO of Grant Thornton Mauritius
 Ihor Kolomoisky, Ukrainian oligarch
 Jho Low, Malaysian financier and mastermind of the 1MDB embezzlement scandal
 Antonio Jose, vulgo Pai, construction tycoon
  Beny Steinmetz, Israeli businessperson
 Ramachandran Ottapathu, Botswanan CEO of Choppies
 Billy Rautenbach, Zimbabwean mining magnate
 Olegario Vázquez Aldir, Mexican businessperson
 Tony Fernandes, Malaysian founder of AirAsia
 Masayoshi Son, Japanese billionaire technology entrepreneur
 The Aboitiz family, Philippine businesspersons
 Joselito Campos, Jr., son of Jose Yao Campos, chairman and CEO of NutriAsia, Vice-chairman of Del Monte Philippines and Chairman of the Fort Bonifacio Development Corporation
 The Gaisano family, Philippine businesspeople
 Oscar Hilado, Chairman of Phinma Corporation
 Elmer Serrano, chairman and President of the ES Consultancy Group and business associate of the Sy family
 Enrique K. Razon, chairman and CEO of International Container Terminal Services and Chairman of Bloomberry
 Peter Rodriguez, Founder of Asian Aerospace Corporation
 The estate of Henry Sy, including Teresita Sy-Coson and his other children, Philippine businesspersons
 Zenaida Tantoco and Anthony Tantoco Huang, CEO of SSI Group, Inc. and President and Director of SSI Group, Inc.
 The Wenceslao family, Philippine businesspeople
 Flavio Briatore, Italian Formula One businessperson
 Giampaolo Angelucci, Italian businessman and entrepreneur
  Stanley Ho, former chairman of Shun Tak Holdings
 Federico Kong Vielman, Guatemalan Director of Banco Industrial
 Mohamed Amersi, British businessperson
 Ben Goldsmith, British financier and member of the Goldsmith Family
 Alexander Temerko, Russian-born British businessman and Conservative Party donor
 Bernie Ecclestone, British Formula One business magnate
 Ata Ahsani, Iranian founder and chairman of Unaoil
  Cyrus Ahsani, Iranian-British treasurer of Monaco's Ambassador's Club
  Saman Ahsani, Iranian-British trustee of the Iran Heritage Foundation
 Pierre Castel, French CEO of Castel Group
 Carlos Alberto Délano, Chilean businessperson
 Alejandro Santo Domingo, Colombian businessperson
 Luis Carlos Sarmiento, Colombian businessperson
 Isaac, Jaime and Gabriel Gilinski, Colombian businesspersons
 Eduardo Pacheco Cortés, Colombian businessperson
 The Barberi family, Colombian businesspersons
 The Char family, Colombian businesspersons and political group
 The Echavarría family, Colombian businesspersons
 Thirukumar Nadesan, former director of Capital Maharaja Organisation
 , Mauritanian businessperson and former minister
 Juan Salgado, Uruguayan businessman
 Francisco Correa Sánchez, Spanish businessman
 Pedro Mouriño, Spanish businessman

Sports personalities
  Ángel Di María, Argentine football player
 Jacques Villeneuve, Canadian racing driver
 Elvis Stojko, Canadian figure skater
 Guy Forget, French tennis administrator and retired professional tennis player
 Sachin Tendulkar, Indian cricketer
 Carlo Ancelotti, Italian football manager
 Roberto Mancini, Italian football manager and former player
 Mino Raiola, Dutch-Italian football agent
 Gianluca Vialli, Italian football player
 Walter Zenga, Italian footballer and manager
 Pep Guardiola, Spanish football manager
  Diego Godín, Uruguayan football player
  Luis Suarez, Uruguayan football player

Media personalities 

  David Furnish, Canadian filmmaker
 Shakira, Colombian singer
 Claudia Schiffer, German model
 Jackie Shroff, Indian Bollywood actor
 Morjana Alaoui, Moroccan actress. She is a daughter of the Moroccan arquitect, Omar Alaoui.
 RedOne, Moroccan singer, songwriter, record producer and record executive
 Mario Vargas Llosa, Peruvian-Spanish Nobel Prize in Literature laureate
 Robbie Santos and the Santos family, Philippine fashion designer, businessperson and educator
  Lee Soo-man, South Korean record executive and record producer (SM Entertainment)
 Julio Iglesias, Spanish singer
 Miguel Bosé, Spanish singer
 Paloma San Basilio, Spanish singer
 , Spanish bullfighter
 Swedish House Mafia, Swedish house music group
 Sergei Roldugin, Russian musician
 Elton John, British singer
 Ringo Starr, British drummer and former member of The Beatles
 Monica Bellucci, Italian actress and model
  Alessandra Ambrosio, Italian-Brazilian model

Organised crime 
 Raffaele Amato, Italian crime boss and head of the Scissionisti di Secondigliano
  Delfo Zorzi, Italian-born Japanese neo-fascist and alleged terrorist

Other 
 Afif Mshangama, Comorian lawyer
  Éric Fiorile, founder of French far-right conspiracy theorist movement Conseil National de Transition
 Homi Rajvansh, Ex-Indian Revenue Service Officer and Additional Managing Director of National Agricultural Cooperative Marketing Federation of India
 Sushil Gupta, Former Income Tax Chief Commissioner
 Massimo Bochicchio, Italian broker
 Igor Isailović, Serbian lawyer, friend and associate of Ana Brnabić and Siniša Mali
 Ricardo Bofill, Spanish architect
 Santiago Calatrava, Spanish architect
 Susanne Reinhardt, Swiss wealth advisor
 Douglas Latchford, British art dealer
 Lady Tina Green, British treasurer to Charlene, Princess of Monaco and wife of Sir Phillip Green
 Robert Durst, convicted murderer and real estate heir
 Carlos Kepce, American lawyer

Organisations 

  Solvay S.A., Belgian chemical company
  Legionaries of Christ, Roman Catholic clerical religious order
  Unaoil, Monaco based energy company
  Alcogal, Panamanian law firm
  Rostec, Russian arms manufacturer
  VTB Bank, Russian financial services provider
  Asiaciti, Singaporean wealth management company
 Gedeihen Engineering Pte Ltd, Malaysian Based Construction Firm & Denmark Offshore Investment Proxy Firm 
  Fidinam, Swiss wealth consultancy
  Bloomsbury Publishing, British publisher
  Farrer & Co, British law firm
 Abbott Laboratories, American healthcare company
 Apple Inc., American technology company
 Baker McKenzie, American law firm
 Nike, American clothing company
 RJR Nabisco, American tobacco manufacturer

See also
List of Pakistanis named in the Pandora Papers
List of people named in the Panama Papers
List of people and organisations named in the Paradise Papers
Reactions to the Pandora Papers

References

External links

Pandora Papers